Sesugh Uhaa (born August 22, 1987) is a Nigerian-American professional wrestler currently signed to WWE, where he performs on the NXT brand under the ring name Apollo Crews.

He started his career in 2009, originally working under the ring name Uhaa Nation, and made his breakthrough in 2011, when he was signed by the Dragon Gate USA promotion, which also led to him making his first trip to Japan to work for Dragon Gate.

He signed with WWE in 2015 and was assigned to the NXT brand, where he was given his current ring name. He was promoted to WWE's main roster in April 2016, where he won the United States Championship in May 2020 and later won the Intercontinental Championship at WrestleMania 37.

Early life
Sesugh Uhaa was born on August 22, 1987, in Sacramento, California and was raised in Atlanta, Georgia and early on fell in love with professional wrestling, becoming a fan of performers such as "Stone Cold" Steve Austin, The Rock, and Kurt Angle. He went to a military high school and began practicing various sports, including amateur wrestling, soccer, football, and track and field, as both an outlet and a way to "get away from the military life". While weight training in high school, he was given the nickname "Uhaa Nation", when his coach noted that he was "as strong as a single nation".

Professional wrestling career

Early career (2009–2011)
After finishing college, Uhaa quickly got a job in order to pay for his professional wrestling training. He began training at the age of 21 under Mr. Hughes at his World Wrestling Alliance 4 (WWA4) promotion's training school in Atlanta. After making his wrestling debut under the ring name Uhaa Nation on August 17, 2009, he spent over a year working mainly for small promotions on the Georgian independent circuit, but also made trips to Houston, Texas-based Pro Wrestling Alliance (PWA) and Phenix City, Alabama-based Great Championship Wrestling (GCW), often working with fellow WWA4 trainee A. R. Fox.

Dragon Gate and affiliates (2011–2015)
On September 9, 2011, Uhaa took part in a tryout seminar held by the Dragon Gate USA promotion. He was immediately signed for appearances for not only Dragon Gate USA, but also its parent promotion, Dragon Gate, and close affiliates Evolve and Full Impact Pro (FIP). He made his wrestling debut for Dragon Gate USA later that same day, defeating Aaron Draven in a squash match. Uhaa made his pay-per-view debut the following day at Untouchable 2011, where he answered Brodie Lee's open challenge and dominated him, before Lee left the ringside area. The following day at the Way of the Ronin 2011 pay-per-view, Uhaa defeated Facade, Flip Kendrick and Sugar Dunkerton in a four-way match. On October 29, Uhaa made his first appearance for Full Impact Pro, when he defeated Jake Manning for FIP Florida Heritage Championship. Uhaa then entered a storyline, where different Dragon Gate USA stables tried to recruit him to join them. On November 30, Uhaa made his Japanese debut for Dragon Gate, during an event produced by the villainous Blood Warriors stable. Uhaa defeated Kotoka in a match that lasted 99 seconds, establishing himself as the newest member of Blood Warriors in the process. For the rest of the tour, which lasted through December 25, Uhaa worked alongside the Blood Warriors stable, winning every one of his matches. At the end of 2011, Dragon Gate USA named Uhaa the Best Newcomer of the year. He also finished second behind Daichi Hashimoto in Wrestling Observer Newsletters award category for Rookie of the Year.

Upon his return to the United States, Uhaa made his debut for Evolve on January 14, 2012, with a win over Pinkie Sanchez. When the following March, Akira Tozawa took over the leadership of Blood Warriors from Cima and renamed the group Mad Blankey, Uhaa Nation followed along to the renamed stable. Uhaa made his first appearance representing Mad Blankey at a DGUSA event on March 29, when he and stablemates Akira Tozawa and BxB Hulk defeated Ronin (Chuck Taylor, Johnny Gargano and Rich Swann) and D.U.F. (Arik Cannon, Pinkie Sanchez, and Sami Callihan) in a three-way trios match. However, during the match Uhaa suffered a knee injury, which sidelined him for a year. Uhaa returned to the ring on February 1, 2013, at Full Impact Pro's Everything Burns iPPV, where he successfully defended the FIP Florida Heritage Championship against Chasyn Rance. On March 2, Uhaa returned to Japan and Dragon Gate, when he and BxB Hulk defeated Don Fujii and Masaaki Mochizuki for the Open the Twin Gate Championship. They lost the title to Shingo Takagi and Yamato on May 5. On May 11, Uhaa was pinned for the first time in a Dragon Gate ring, when he was eliminated by Jimmy Susumu in the first round of the 2013 King of Gate tournament. On July 28 at Enter the Dragon 2013, Dragon Gate USA's fourth anniversary event, Uhaa suffered his first pinfall loss in the promotion, when he was defeated by Anthony Nese. On August 9, Uhaa lost the FIP Florida Heritage Championship to Gran Akuma. Back in Dragon Gate, Mad Blankey turned on Uhaa Nation on August 30, after he refused to wrestle Akira Tozawa, who had recently been kicked out of the group. Uhaa then formed a new partnership with Tozawa and Shingo Takagi. On September 12, the three were joined by Masato Yoshino, Ricochet, and Shachihoko Boy to form a new stable, which was on October 6 named Monster Express. On January 12, 2014, Uhaa received his first shot at Dragon Gate USA's top title, the Open the Freedom Gate Championship, but was defeated by the defending champion, Johnny Gargano. On March 6, Uhaa also received his first shot at Dragon Gate's top title, the Open the Dream Gate Championship, but was defeated by the defending champion, Monster Express stablemate Ricochet. On May 23, it was reported that Uhaa had signed a new contract with Dragon Gate USA.

On February 5, 2015, Uhaa made his return to Dragon Gate as Akira Tozawa's surprise partner in a tag team match, where they defeated Cyber Kong and Don Fujii. At the end of the event, Uhaa confronted BxB Hulk, challenging him to a match for the Open the Dream Gate Championship. On March 1, Uhaa failed in his title challenge against Hulk, after which he announced he had wrestled his final match for Dragon Gate. Uhaa worked his final Evolve events later that month during WWNLive's WrestleMania week.

WWE

NXT (2014–2016) 
In October 2014, Uhaa took part in a WWE tryout camp, resulting in a developmental contract offer. Starting on December 31, 2014, multiple sources reported that Uhaa had come to terms on a contract with WWE. Uhaa reported to the WWE Performance Center, the home of its NXT developmental brand, on April 6, 2015. WWE officially announced Uhaa as part of a new class of NXT recruits in an April 13 press release. Uhaa made his first televised appearance on the May 6 episode of NXT, signing an NXT contract in a segment with William Regal. Uhaa started working NXT house shows the following month, retaining the Uhaa Nation ring name.

On August 5, it was announced that Uhaa, now working under the new ring name Apollo Crews, would be making his televised NXT in-ring debut on August 22 at NXT TakeOver: Brooklyn. At NXT TakeOver: Brooklyn, Crews defeated Tye Dillinger in his debut. Crews made his NXT debut on the September 2 episode of NXT, defeating Martin Stone. At NXT TakeOver: Respect, Crews defeated Tyler Breeze.  On the October 14 episode of NXT, Crews won a battle royal to become the number one contender to the NXT Championship. Crews received his title shot against Finn Bálor on the November 4 episode of NXT, winning the match by disqualification, when he was attacked by Baron Corbin, who held a grudge against Crews for eliminating him from the number one contender's battle royal. The rivalry between Crews and Corbin led to a match at NXT TakeOver: London, which Corbin won. Crews then started a feud with Elias Samson, after Crews saved Johnny Gargano from Samson's assault on the March 23, 2016, episode of NXT. The two would subsequently have a match on the April 6 episode of NXT, which was won by Crews.

Main roster beginnings (2016–2017) 
On the April 4, 2016, episode of Raw, Crews made his main roster debut by defeating Tyler Breeze. Crews remained undefeated over the following weeks, defeating the likes of Curtis Axel, Adam Rose, Heath Slater and Stardust. He suffered his first loss in WWE on the May 23 episode of Raw, when he was defeated by Chris Jericho in a Money in the Bank qualifying match, after Sheamus attacked Crews before the match. Crews and Sheamus faced off at the Money in the Bank pay-per-view, where Crews was victorious.

As part of the draft on July 19, Crews was drafted to the SmackDown brand. On the August 2 episode of SmackDown, Crews defeated Kalisto and Baron Corbin in a triple threat match to become the number one contender to the Intercontinental Championship. Crews received his title shot on August 21 at SummerSlam, but was defeated by The Miz. On the Backlash pre-show on September 11, Crews was defeated Corbin. At TLC: Tables, Ladders & Chairs in December, Crews teamed with American Alpha (Chad Gable and Jason Jordan) and The Hype Bros (Mojo Rawley and Zack Ryder) in a win over Curt Hawkins, The Vaudevillains (Aiden English and Simon Gotch), and The Ascension (Konnor and Viktor) in a 10-man tag team match.

At the Royal Rumble on January 29, 2017, Crews took part in his first Royal Rumble match, entering as number 22 and being eliminated by Luke Harper. Crews then teamed up with Kalisto to feud with Dolph Ziggler, after Ziggler attacked Kalisto. At Elimination Chamber, Crews and Kalisto defeated Ziggler in a two-on-one handicap match. Following the match, Ziggler attacked the two, injuring Crews' ankle, which was trapped in a chair. This led to a chairs match on the February 28 episode of SmackDown, where Ziggler was victorious. At WrestleMania 33, Crews competed in the André the Giant Memorial Battle Royal, which was won by Mojo Rawley.

Titus Worldwide (2017–2019) 

As part of the Superstar Shake-up, Crews was moved to the Raw brand. Shortly thereafter, a storyline began with Titus O'Neil offering Crews his managerial services. After becoming affiliated with "The Titus Brand", Crews started displaying attitude and cockiness. On the May 22 episode of Raw, Kalisto confronted Crews about his alliance with The Titus Brand, resulting in a match between the two, which Crews lost. At Extreme Rules, Crews was defeated by Kalisto. During that period, Akira Tozawa joined the Titus Brand, turning it into "Titus Worldwide". Crews would then enter a short feud with Elias, where Crews lost to Elias at No Mercy, the following night on Raw and October 9 episode of Raw. During this time, Dana Brooke joined Titus Worldwide as their manager, and Tozawa quietly left the faction.

On the January 8, 2018 and January 15 episodes of Raw, Crews and O'Neil defeated Raw Tag Team Champions Cesaro and Sheamus in upset victories. At Royal Rumble, Crews entered the Royal Rumble as the thirteenth entrant, being eliminated by Cesaro. On February 19, his ring name was shortened to simply "Apollo". At Elimination Chamber on February 25, Apollo and O'Neil failed to capture the titles, and were again unsuccessful in a rematch the following night on Raw. At WrestleMania 34, Apollo competed in the André the Giant Memorial Battle Royal, in which he was unsuccessful. On the April 16 episode of Raw, his ring name was reverted to Apollo Crews. On April 27 at the Greatest Royal Rumble, Crews entered the Royal Rumble match at number 33, eliminating Chad Gable before eliminated by Randy Orton. On the September 3 episode of Raw, Dana Brooke parted ways with Titus Worldwide after mid-match coaching backfired, causing Brooke to lose her match.

On the October 15 episode of Raw, Crews returned as a singles competitor when he interrupted Elias during his performance, thus disbanding Titus Worldwide. The following week, he lost to Elias. On the December 31 episode of Raw, Crews won a battle royal by eliminating eight wrestlers to become the number one contender for the Intercontinental Championship against Dean Ambrose. That same night, he was defeated by Ambrose. On January 27, 2019, at the Royal Rumble, Crews competed in the Royal Rumble match, where he was eliminated by Baron Corbin. At WrestleMania 35, Crews competed in the André the Giant Memorial Battle Royal, but was eliminated by Andrade.

United States Champion (2019–2020) 
As part of Superstar Shake-up, Crews was drafted back to the SmackDown brand. At Super ShowDown on June 7, Crews unsuccessfully competed in the 51-man battle royal. At SummerSlam, Crews faced Buddy Murphy, but the match quickly ended in a disqualification loss for Crews after interference from Erick Rowan. In August, Crews competed in the King of the Ring tournament, where was defeated by Andrade in the first round. Crews participated in a 20-man battle royal at the Crown Jewel event in October; however, he was unsuccessful. In early 2020, Crews reignited his feud with Sheamus, and Crews lost to Sheamus in singles action on the February 7, 2020, episode of SmackDown and again the following week this time in a handicap match with Crews teaming with Shorty G unsuccessfully. The feud ended when Crews lost to Sheamus on the March 6 episode of SmackDown.

On the April 6 episode of Raw, Crews was traded to the Raw brand, and lost to Aleister Black in his first match back as a Raw superstar. On the April 20 episode of Raw, Crews defeated MVP to qualify for the Money in the Bank ladder match, However, he injured his knee in a United States Championship match against Andrade the following week, ruling him out of the ladder match. Shortly after his return, off the back of a winning streak, on the May 25 episode of Raw, Crews would defeat Andrade to win the United States Championship, his first title in WWE, and would defeat him again at Backlash to retain the title. In June, he began a feud with The Hurt Business after Crews rejected an offer to join the stable. A title defense was set up between Crews and The Hurt Business' leader MVP at The Horror Show at Extreme Rules; however, Crews was absent at the event, due to supposedly testing positive for COVID-19. Crews would face off against MVP on several title matches, until he lost the belt against fellow The Hurt Business member Bobby Lashley at Payback. At Clash of Champions, Crews failed to regain the title from Lashley. As part of the 2020 Draft in October, Crews was drafted back to the SmackDown brand.

Intercontinental Champion and Nigerian Prince (2020–2021) 
On the December 25 episode of SmackDown, Crews helped Big E win the Intercontinental Championship in a lumberjack match by preventing then-holder Sami Zayn from escaping the arena. On the January 8, 2021, episode of SmackDown, Big E issued an open challenge for the title, which Crews immediately accepted, and Big E won. On the February 12 episode of SmackDown, Crews interfered the match between Big E and Shinsuke Nakamura and attacked Big E, thus turning heel for the first time in his career. The following week, after losing to Nakamura, Crews attacked Nakamura and Big E again, confirming his turn.

Crews would then debut a new character where he declared himself Nigerian royalty, began to speak with a Nigerian accent in his promos in order to "embrace who he really is" and began coming to the ring with a spear. His theme song was even given a remix , with Nigerian drums. Crews failed to win the Intercontinental Championship at Fastlane. On the April 2 episode of Smackdown, Crews would challenge Big E at WrestleMania 37 in a Nigerian Drum Fight for the Intercontinental title and Big E would accept. At WrestleMania 37, he defeated Big E with the help of Commander Azeez to win the Intercontinental Championship. Crews then successfully retained his title against Kevin Owens on the April 23 episode of SmackDown, against Owens, Big E, and Sami Zayn in a fatal four-way match on the May 21 episode of SmackDown, and against Owens again on the June 4 episode of SmackDown. On the August 13 episode of SmackDown, Crews lost the title to King Nakamura, ending his reign at 124 days.

As part of the 2021 Draft, both Crews and Azeez were drafted to the Raw brand.

At Survivor Series, he entered The Rock’s 25th Anniversary Battle Royal but ultimately lost. The following night on RAW, he challenged Damian Priest for the latters United States Championship but lost. 

On the January 10 episode of RAW, Crews teamed with The Dirty Dawgs, defeating The Street Profits and Priest. 

On WrestleMania SmackDown on April 1, Crews participated in the Andre the Giant Memorial Battle Royal but ultimately lost.

Return to NXT (2022–present) 
In June, he and Azeez was sent to NXT 2.0, making his return without Azeez on the June 7, 2022 episode of NXT 2.0 as a  face, confronting NXT Champion Bron Breakker. He would make his in ring return for the brand on the same night, teaming up with Solo Sikoa to take on Carmelo Hayes and Grayson Waller, which they would go on to win. On December 10 at NXT Deadline, Crews challenged Breakker for the NXT Championship in a losing effort.

Other media
Uhaa, as Apollo Crews, has appeared in the video games as a playable character in WWE 2K17 (as a downloadable character), WWE 2K18, WWE 2K19, WWE 2K20, WWE 2K22 and WWE 2K Battlegrounds.

Personal life
Uhaa is of Nigerian descent. His father is originally from Vandeikya, Benue State in the middle belt region of Nigeria. His mother is also from Benue State, Nigeria. Uhaa's sister is in the United States Army and stationed in San Antonio, Texas.

Uhaa is married to Linda Palonen. They have a daughter Sade (born June 22, 2017) and son Kai (born February 9, 2019).

Championships and accomplishments
Dragon Gate
Open the Twin Gate Championship (1 time) – with BxB Hulk
Dragon Gate USA
Best Newcomer (2011)
Full Impact Pro
FIP Florida Heritage Championship (1 time)
Great Championship Wrestling
GCW Heavyweight Championship (1 time)
Preston City Wrestling
PCW Heavyweight Championship (1 time)
Pro Wrestling Illustrated
Ranked No. 65 of the top 500 singles wrestlers in the PWI 500 in 2021
WWE
WWE Intercontinental Championship (1 time)                                                                                                                                                                                                                    
WWE United States Championship (1 time)

References

External links

Dragon Gate profile 

1987 births
African-American male professional wrestlers
American male professional wrestlers
American sportspeople of Nigerian descent
Living people
NWA/WCW/WWE United States Heavyweight Champions
Phi Beta Sigma Brothers
Professional wrestlers from California
Sportspeople from Sacramento, California
WWF/WWE Intercontinental Champions
American people of Nigerian descent
21st-century professional wrestlers
Open the Twin Gate Champions